Métlaoui is a town and commune in the Gafsa Governorate, Tunisia. In 2014 it had a population of 38,634.

Infrastructure 
Métlaoui is important railway station of southern Tunisia. City lies nearby Sousse-Tozeur line. The branch to Redeyef (with interconnection to Kasserine) splits nearby. This line is famous because is runs through scenic selja gorges.

Until the 2011 Jasmine Revolution, Métlaoui was home to a Natural History Museum filled with fossil specimens discovered during mining operations. In 2019, the fossil remains were re-excavated from the ruins and sent to the University of Gafsa for storage.

See also
List of cities in Tunisia

References

Communes of Tunisia
Populated places in Gafsa Governorate
Tunisia geography articles needing translation from French Wikipedia

la ville de mon coeur <3